In statistical thermodynamics, thermodynamic beta, also known as coldness, is the reciprocal of the thermodynamic temperature of a system: (where  is the temperature and  is Boltzmann constant).

Thermodynamic beta has units reciprocal to that of energy (in SI units, reciprocal joules). In non-thermal units, it can also be measured in byte per joule, or more conveniently, gigabyte per nanojoule; 1 K−1 is equivalent to about 13,062 gigabytes per nanojoule; at room temperature:  = 300K, β ≈  ≈  ≈ . The conversion factor is 1 GB/nJ =  J−1.

Description 
Thermodynamic beta is essentially the connection between the information theory and statistical mechanics interpretation of a physical system through its entropy and the thermodynamics associated with its energy. It expresses the response of entropy to an increase in energy. If a system is challenged with a small amount of energy, then β describes the amount the system will randomize.

Via the statistical definition of temperature as a function of entropy, the coldness function can be calculated in the microcanonical ensemble from the formula

(i.e., the partial derivative of the entropy  with respect to the energy  at constant volume  and particle number ).

Advantages 

In addition,  has the advantage of being easier to understand causally: If a small amount of heat is added to a system,  is the increase in entropy divided by the increase in heat. Temperature is difficult to interpret in the same sense, as it is not possible to "Add entropy" to a system except indirectly, by modifying other quantities such as temperature, volume, or number of particles.

Statistical interpretation 

From the statistical point of view, β is a numerical quantity relating two macroscopic systems in equilibrium. The exact formulation is as follows. Consider two systems, 1 and 2, in thermal contact, with respective energies E1 and E2. We assume E1 + E2 = some constant E. The number of microstates of each system will be denoted by Ω1 and Ω2. Under our assumptions Ωi depends only on Ei. We also assume that any microstate of system 1 consistent with E1 can coexist with any microstate of system 2 consistent with E2. Thus, the number of microstates for the combined system is

We will derive β from the fundamental assumption of statistical mechanics:

When the combined system reaches equilibrium, the number Ω is maximized.

(In other words, the system naturally seeks the maximum number of microstates.) Therefore, at equilibrium,

But E1 + E2 = E implies

So

i.e.

The above relation motivates a definition of β:

Connection of statistical view with thermodynamic view
When two systems are in equilibrium, they have the same thermodynamic temperature T. Thus intuitively, one would expect β (as defined via microstates) to be related to T in some way. This link is provided by Boltzmann's fundamental assumption written as

where kB is the Boltzmann constant, S is the classical thermodynamic entropy, and Ω is the number of microstates. So

Substituting into the definition of β from the statistical definition above gives

Comparing with thermodynamic formula

we have

where  is called the fundamental temperature of the system, and has units of energy.

See also
 Boltzmann distribution
 Canonical ensemble
 Ising model

References

Statistical mechanics
Scalar physical quantities